Julio Palau Lozano (Alginet, 1925-2015) was a professional Valencian pilota Escala i corda variant player known as Juliet d'Alginet. He is one of only five players in the Pelayo trinquet's Honor gallery.

He retired in 1968 and died on 7 November 2015.

References 

1925 births
2015 deaths
People from Ribera Alta (comarca)
Sportspeople from the Province of Valencia
Pilotaris from the Valencian Community